Fort Delaware State Park is a  Delaware state park on Pea Patch Island in New Castle County, Delaware. A fortress was built on Pea Patch Island by the United States Army in 1815, near the conclusion of the War of 1812, to protect the harbors of Wilmington, Delaware and Philadelphia, Pennsylvania. The fort was burned and rebuilt in the years prior to the American Civil War, and soon after the start of the war the fort was converted to a Prisoner of War camp. Fort Delaware continued to protect the mouth of the Delaware River through World War I and II. Pea Patch Island and Fort Delaware was declared surplus land by the United States Department of Defense in 1945.

Fort Delaware State Park, one of the first state parks in Delaware, was established in 1951. The park, which can only be accessed by ferry, is open for historic programs at Fort Delaware. The fort is listed on the National Register of Historic Places. In addition to historical preservation, Fort Delaware State Park is also open for picnicking and hiking.

Visitors to the park may reach it by ferry from Delaware City or Fort Mott State Park in New Jersey. Passengers aboard the ferry are granted access to Fort Mott State Park.

History
Pea Patch Island emerged as a mud bank in the Delaware River in the 18th century. According to folklore, the island received its name after a ship full of peas ran aground on it, spilling its contents and leading to a growth of the plant on the island. By 1814, the island had grown sufficiently large for the construction of Fort Delaware. The original wood structure was replaced by the current brick and concrete one in 1859. During the American Civil War, Fort Delaware was used by the Union as a camp for Confederate prisoners, in particular those captured in 1863 at the Battle of Gettysburg. Many of the prisoners who died at the fort are buried at nearby Finns Point National Cemetery in New Jersey.

After the release of the last of the remaining Civil War prisoners, only a small caretaker force was left behind at Fort Delaware, and it was largely abandoned in 1870. By 1898, rising tensions between Spain and the United States led to Fort Delaware once again serving as a potential frontline in protecting the ports of the Delaware River. The United States Congress authorized the installation of three  guns at the south end of Pea Patch Island. The guns were installed in 1898, at the time of the Spanish–American War. A garrison was once again in place at Fort Delaware until 1903, when another small caretaker force was left. The fort was garrisoned once again in 1917, following the United States entry into World War I, but most troops left in 1919. Fort Delaware was manned again during World War II following the December 7, 1941 Attack of Pearl Harbor. The guns were removed in 1943, the fort was abandoned in 1944, and it was declared "surplus property" in 1945. Ownership of Pea Patch Island and Fort Delaware was transferred to the state of Delaware in 1947. Fort Delaware State Park was opened to the public in 1951.

Historic interpretation
Fort Delaware State Park is a center of historic Civil War interpretation. Award winning reenactors provide a glimpse into the past of Pea Patch Island. Visitors to the park may have the chance to watch a blacksmith at work, take part in the firing of a gunpowder charge of an  Columbiad gun or assist a laundress at work.

A group of reenactors pays special attention to Captain George Ahl and his band of former confederate soldiers who formed the 1st Delaware Heavy Artillery. Captain Ahl obtained permission from the War Department to form a battery of Confederate prisoners who could prove they had been conscripted into the Confederate Army. Upon taking an oath of allegiance they were permitted to join the Federal Army. Volunteers have recreated Ahl's Battery at Fort Delaware State Park. They have assumed the identities of members of the battery. The reenactors give demonstrations of what life was like for the members of the 1st Delaware Heavy Artillery.

The Fort Delaware State Park Gift Shop in Delaware City is the only Civil War gift shop in Delaware, and has a wide variety of books and souvenirs are available. The Fort Delaware Society is a non-profit group dedicated to the preservation and historical interpretation of Fort Delaware.

Wildlife
Fort Delaware State Park is home to a migratory bird rookery, considered to be the largest heronry north of Florida. Ornithologists believe that ibises, egrets, and herons began nesting on the northern part of Pea Patch Island in the 1950s or 1960s on land that was deposited there by the United States Army Corps of Engineers in the early 1900s. The population of birds at Fort Delaware State Park grew from about 2,000 pairs of nesting birds to 12,000 pairs as they were pushed from their nesting areas on the mainland by man. Scientists have become concerned about the decreasing population of birds on Pea Patch Island. The present estimate of nesting pairs stands at 7,000. Studies have shown that nearly half the chicks born at the heronry within the last five years have died before they were old enough to leave their parents care.

Other than coastal erosion, scientist have found little at the park to threaten the herons, ibises, and egrets. It is believed that changing land-use in the estuary and surrounding land has affected the populations. Representatives from local, state and federal governments have teamed together with non-profit wildlife organizations, business, and industry to create a Special Area Management Plan to help change the downward trend in bird populations at Fort Delaware State Park. Since Beach erosion affecting Pea Patch Island was recognized as a potential threat to the Fort in 1999, the United States Army Corps of Engineers erected a  seawall during the winter of 2005-2006.

Nearby state parks
The following state parks are within  of Fort Delaware State Park:
Alapocas Run State Park (New Castle County)
Auburn Valley State Park (New Castle County)
Bellevue State Park (New Castle County)
Brandywine Creek State Park (New Castle County)
Elk Neck State Park (Maryland)
Fort DuPont State Park (New Castle County)
Fort Mott State Park (New Jersey)
Fox Point State Park (New Castle County)
First State Heritage Park at Dover (Kent County)
Lums Pond State Park (New Castle County)
Parvin State Park (New Jersey)
Ridley Creek State Park (Pennsylvania)
Wilmington State Parks  (New Castle County)
White Clay Creek Preserve (Pennsylvania)
White Clay Creek State Park (New Castle County)

References

External links
 Fort Delaware State Park
 Fort Delaware Sea Wall Photographs, Written Historical and Descriptive Data — Historic American Engineering Record

Parks in New Castle County, Delaware
State parks of Delaware
Protected areas established in 1951
Museums in New Castle County, Delaware
Military and war museums in Delaware
Living museums in the United States
History museums in Delaware
1951 establishments in Delaware
Open-air museums in the United States